Jargulica can refer to:
Jargulica, Radoviš, a village in Radoviš Municipality, North Macedonia
Jargulica, Valandovo, a village in Valandovo Municipality, North Macedonia